Christian Nikolaus Eberlein (1720–1788), a German historical painter, was born at Rudolstadt in 1720. He worked in Göttingen, Wolfenbüttel, and Salzdahlum, and in 1776 became inspector of the gallery in the last-named town, and made good copies of many of the pictures therein. He died at Salzdahlum in 1788.

His son, Christian Eberhard Eberlein, who was also a painter, was born at Wolfenbüttel in 1749, and died at Göttingen in 1804.

References
 

1720 births
1788 deaths
18th-century German painters
18th-century German male artists
German male painters
People from Rudolstadt